Stillingia terminalis is a species of flowering plant in the family Euphorbiaceae. It was described in 1861. It is native to Madagascar.

References

terminalis
Plants described in 1861
Endemic flora of Madagascar
Taxa named by Henri Ernest Baillon